2007 German Open can refer to:
2007 German Open (tennis)
2007 German Open (badminton)